Seismic loading is one of the basic concepts of earthquake engineering which means application of an earthquake-generated agitation to a structure. It happens at contact surfaces of a structure either with the ground, or with adjacent structures, or with gravity waves from tsunami.

Seismic loading depends, primarily, on:

 Anticipated earthquake's parameters at the site - known as seismic hazard
 Geotechnical parameters of the site
 Structure's parameters
 Characteristics of the anticipated gravity waves from tsunami (if applicable).

Sometimes, seismic load exceeds ability of a structure to resist it without being broken, partially or completely  Due to their mutual interaction, seismic loading and seismic performance of a structure are intimately related.

See also
Earthquake engineering structures

References

Earthquake and seismic risk mitigation
Earthquake engineering